Steven Lawrence Kroll (August 11, 1941 – March 8, 2011) was an American children's book author.  He wrote 96 books, including Is Milton Missing? (1975), The Biggest Pumpkin Ever (1984), Sweet America (2000), When I Dream of Heaven (2000), Jungle Bullies (2006).

Biography 

Born in Manhattan, he attended the McBurney School and Harvard University, graduating with a degree in American history and literature in 1962.  Prior to becoming a full-time author, he was an editor at Chatto & Windus in London and Holt, Rinehart & Winston in New York City.

References

External links

 

1941 births
2011 deaths
American children's writers
American book editors
People from Manhattan
Harvard University alumni
McBurney School alumni